The First Lady of Colombia (First Lady of the Nation) is the title held by the hostess of the House of Nariño, usually the wife of the president of Colombia, concurrent with the president's term in office. Although the first lady's role has never been codified or officially defined, she figures prominently in the political and social life of Colombia.

Verónica Alcocer is the current first lady of Colombia, as wife of the 34th and current president of Colombia, Gustavo Petro.

While the title was not in general use until much later, María Josefa Mosquera y Hurtado, the wife of Joaquín de Mosquera y Arboleda, is considered to be the inaugural first lady of Colombia.

Current
Since August 2022 the first lady is Verónica Alcocer. At present, there are six living former first ladies: Nydia Quintero Turbay, ex-wife of Julio César Turbay Ayala; Ana Milena Muñoz Gómez, wife of César Gaviria Trujillo; Jacquin Strouss Lucena, wife of Ernesto Samper Pizano; Nohra Puyana Bickenbach, wife of Andrés Pastrana Arango; Lina María Moreno Mejía, wife of Álvaro Uribe Vélez; and María Clemencia Rodríguez Múnera, wife of Juan Manuel Santos Calderón; and María Juliana Ruiz, wife of Ivan Duque.

The spouse of the president of Colombia has up until now, always been a woman, and so have been most of the spouses of those who have run for office, with the most recent exception being Noemí Sanín Posada, a Conservative party presidential candidate in the 2002 and 2010 presidential elections, who although unmarried both times, her boyfriend, Javier Aguirre, was given a similar treatment by the media during the campaign as the wives of the rest of the candidates, noting that he would have been the first man to accompany a "presidentress" to the Palace of Nariño.

History

Upon the unequivocal declaration of independence of the consolidated territory of the former Viceroyalty of the New Granada at the Congress of Cúcuta and the ratification of the Constitution, Congress elected General Simón Bolívar Palacios as President of Colombia. Bolívar however, was a widower (his wife María Teresa Rodríguez del Toro y Alaysa died in 1803), had no children, his mother had died, and his sisters resided far away from the capital, leaving no female relations to fulfil any duties that would today be associated with that of the first lady. Bolívar did however, have a lover, Manuela Sáenz Aizpuru, a married woman who was the love of his life, and with whom he lived with despite the conservative views of his time. Therefore, Sáenz served as the unofficial hostess of the residence of Bolívar, the San Carlos Palace, as there was no official presidential palace at the time. Nevertheless, the extent of Sáenz's involvement in the Bolívar household was such that when political enemies of Bolívar broke into the house in an attempt to assassinate the president, she was there and dissuaded Bolívar from confronting his attackers and instead flee through window in their chambers, and although she was vilified during her lifetime, she is now considered a national hero.

Upon the resignation of Bolívar to the presidency in 1830, Congress elected Joaquín de Mosquera y Arboleda to succeed Bolívar as the 2nd president of Colombia. Mosquera was married to María Josefa Mosquera y Hurtado, his first cousin, who became the first person to be now considered as the official first lady of Colombia, that is, of what is now known as Gran Colombia. The first first lady of present-day Colombia was Soledad Román Polanco, the second wife of Rafael Núñez Moledo. Núñez first came to power in 1880 as President of what it was then known as the United States of Colombia, but when he moved to the capital, his wife Soledad Román stayed behind in their hometown of Cartagena, as their union was heavily criticized by the conservative society and media of the time for Núñez had legally divorced his first wife, María de los Dolores Gallegos Martínez, and married Román in a civil ceremony, but according to canon law they remained married in the eyes of God, and thus Núñez was accused of adultery and Román regarded as his mistress. Román eventually moved to Bogotá when the popularity of her husband rose to the point that most could overlook their union. When the Colombian Constitution of 1886 was ratified, present day Colombia was formed, with Núñez as the 1st president of Colombia, and Román as the 1st first lady. The couple were eventually able to marry through the Church when Gallegos, Núñez's first wife, died, allowing them to consecrate their already legal union through the Church and in the eyes of the conservative Catholic society. Their wedding took place while Núñez was in office on 23 February 1889.

The use of the title "First Lady" originated in the United States, first mentioned in reference to Dolley Madison, it was later used in other forms until 1877 when it was used in print media to refer to Lucy Webb Hayes, wife of Rutherford B. Hayes. In Colombia, the title was first used in print media in 1833, when the magazine Cromos used it to refer to the wife of President Franklin D. Roosevelt, Eleanor Roosevelt as First Lady of the United States, by then the term was broadly used in the United States to refer to the wife of the president. The title was first adopted for Colombian use the following year, when on 8 August 1834 Cromos referred to María Michelsen Lombana as "First Lady of Colombia" during the inauguration of her husband, President Alfonso López Michelsen.

Role
The position of the first lady is unofficial, it is not an elected one, carries no official duties, and receives no salary. Nonetheless, first ladies have held a highly visible position in Colombian society. The role of the first lady has evolved over the years, but she is, first and foremost, the spouse of the president.

For much of history, the spouse of the president, as in the case of most women in Colombia, did not have any sort of real influence or recognition. According to the Constitutional Court of Colombia, the first lady holds the title of private citizen before the public administration, but it gives the first lady a further special role, as, being the spouse of the president, the first lady symbolically embodies, along with the president of the republic, the idea of national unity in accordance to Article 188 of the 1991 Colombian Constitution.

On 30 December 1968 Congress passed Law 75 of 1968 that created the Colombian Institute for Family Welfare (ICBF); Article 58 stated that "The Presidency of the Institute shall be exercised by the wife of the President...". This was the first instance that legal responsibility was granted to the Office of the First Lady on a permanent basis. This was later modified by Article 25 of Law 7 of 1979 that changed the role of the first lady in the ICBF: "The board of directors will be presided by the spouse of the President". This resolved a conflict of authority between the similar offices of President (until then the first lady) and the general director; also of note was the modified terminology of wife to spouse, introducing the possibility of a future president to be a woman and her spouse to be a man. Law 7 of 1979 allowed the first lady to remain involved with the ICBF without any specific duties in an ad honorem capacity.

Sentence C-537 of 1993 of the Constitutional Court of Colombia, however, deemed Article 58 Law 7 of 1979 unconstitutional, because it violated the principle of equal opportunity to access positions in public service by creating unjustifiable prerequisites, such as being married to the president. The Court however, clarified that their sentence did not signify the marginalization of the first lady from political activity, and that she as wife of the president embodied the idea of national unity.

Since then, the first lady has continued to pursue, at her discretion, humanitarian causes in an ad honorem capacity. Over the course of the 20th century it became increasingly common for first ladies to select specific causes to promote, usually ones that are not politically divisive. María Teresa Londoño led the collection for donations during the Colombia–Peru War, María Michelsen Lombana championed orphans' rights and care, Lorenza Villegas Restrepo pioneered public for health care services, Bertha Hernández Fernández was a leader of the women's suffrage movement, Cecilia de la Fuente de Lleras campaigned for the creation of the Institute for Family Welfare, Cecilia Caballero Blanco campaigned for legislation that ended the legal discrimination based on the legitimacy of children and their parentage, Nydia Quintero Turbay focused on disaster relief and assistance, Ana Milena Muñoz Gómez promoted higher education and culture, and Lina María Moreno Mejía led national pregnancy prevention programs in adolescents and promoted sexual and reproductive health rights for women.

Partial list of first ladies

References

 
Colombia